"Little Boy Blue" is a nursery rhyme.

Little Boy Blue may also refer to:

 Little Boy Blue (film), a 1997 drama starring Ryan Phillippe, Nastassja Kinski, and John Savage
 Little Boy Blue (novel), a 1981 novel by Edward Bunker
 "Little Boy Blue" (poem), an 1888 poem by Eugene Field
 Little Boy Blue (TV series), a 2017 TV series based on the murder of Rhys Jones
"Little Boy Blue", parlour song by Ethelbert Woodbridge Nevin
 The Little Boy Blues, an American rock band

See also
 Little Boy Boo, a "Looney Tunes" cartoon
 Boy Blue (disambiguation)